Princess Khaekhaiduang (11 January 1863 - 19 August 1929) was a Princess of Siam (later Thailand). She was a member of the Siamese royal family and was a daughter of King Mongkut and Consort Tieng.

Her mother was Chao Chom Manda Tieng (daughter of Dis Rojanadis and Khai Rojanadis), She was given the full name Phra Chao Borom Wong Ther Phra Ong Chao Khaekhaiduang.

Princess Khaekhaiduang died on 19 August 1929 at the age of 66.

Ancestry

References 

1863 births
1929 deaths
19th-century Thai women
19th-century Chakri dynasty
20th-century Thai women
20th-century Chakri dynasty
Thai female Phra Ong Chao
Children of Mongkut
People from Bangkok
Daughters of kings